Malaisia scandens  subsp.  megacarpa  is a flowering plant in the mulberry family. The subspecific epithet comes from the Greek mega ("big") and carpos ("fruit"), with reference to the larger fruits in this subspecies.

Description
It is a rough-barked, woody climber. The alternate, leathery, oval leaves are usually 80–110 mm long and 40–50 mm wide. The male flowers are minute, occurring in cylindrical inflorescences up to 10 mm long, the female flowers in globular heads 4 mm across, appearing from July to October. The bright red fruits are 12 mm across.

Distribution and habitat
The subspecies is endemic to Australia's subtropical Lord Howe Island in the Tasman Sea, where it is common in lowland forest.

References

Moraceae
Rosales of Australia
Endemic flora of Lord Howe Island
Plants described in 1986
Plant subspecies